Arab Media Group (AMG) is a Dubai, United Arab Emirates based entertainment company and a strategic business vertical of Dubai Holding. AMG covers radio broadcasting, event management, and family entertainment. AMG is an engaging premier integrated entertainment company, managing Global Village, Arabian Radio Network and Done Events. Founded in March 2005, AMG has a workforce of just over 300 staff across its three Dubai-based offices.

Arab Media Group subsidiaries
 Global Village: Regions leading family and cultural entertainment destination.
 Arabian Radio Network, operates nine of the region’s leading radio stations across multi platforms attracting millions of listeners daily, making it the largest radio network in the UAE:
 Dubai 92 - English language adult contemporary radio
 Dubai Eye 103.8 - English language, multicultural talk radio station
 Virgin Radio 104.4 - English language hit music station
 City 101.6 - Hindi youth music station
 Hit 96.7 - Malayalam youth music station with strong news and information focus
 Al Khaleejiya 100.9 - GCC station with strong UAE National focus
 Al Arabiya 99 - Arab expatriate youth music station
 Radio Shoma 93.4 FM - Persian
 Tag 91.1 - the first Filipino premium radio station in the UAE
 Done Events: Done Events, a multi-facetted and award-winning events and live entertainment  company, producing annual marquee government and corporate events as well as some of the biggest concerts regionally.

Television assets merger with Dubai Media Incorporated
As a direct impact of the 2007 financial crisis, after considerable layoffs of the workforce, AMG's television assets, held via Arabian Television Network were merged with Dubai state broadcaster Dubai Media Incorporated in late 2009.

See also
 Dubai Holding
 News Corporation
 Viacom
 RedfestDXB (Music festival managed by Virgin Radio Dubai under Arabian Radio Network, a subsidiary of the AMG group.)

References

External links
 Arab Media Group
 City 101.6
 Dubai 92
 Hit 96.7
 Virgin Radio Dubai
 Tag 91.1
 Arabian Radio Network
 Done Events

Arab mass media
Mass media companies of the United Arab Emirates
Mass media in Dubai
Government-owned companies of the United Arab Emirates
Entertainment companies established in 2005
Mass media companies established in 2005
2005 establishments in the United Arab Emirates